The 2023 Nablus attack was a violent incident that took place on March 18, 2023, where two German nationals, Gerald  visited an area of Nablus in the West Bank under Palestinian Authority control, and were surrounded by a group of Palestinians who attacked their vehicle by throwing stones, street signs and one Palestinian who brandished a knife and slashed the vehicle's tires .

Background
Israelis are generally prohibited from entering any Palestinian Authority-controlled areas, including Nablus. The Federal Republic of Germany's Foreign Office "urgently" advises advises all German nationals against travel to the region around Nablus.

2 German tourists who had visited Israel and the Palestinian Territories many times in the past without issue, most recently in 2018, were driving to Nablus (Shechem) from Tel Aviv in an Israeli rental car they had rented in Gush Dan, on the recommendation of friends to visit the Old City and view the architecture and see Jacob's Well and various churches such as St. Justin's Catholic Church.

Incident

Two German tourists were attacked by an angry mob of Palestinians after they entered Nablus in a Kia Picanto an Israeli ride-share vehicle. The German nationals were violently attacked by Palestinians, as showed in footage obtained by Palestinian media outlets. The first Palestinian men who attacked the tourists came out of taxis that were following the tourists car, and other Palestinian young men on the street joined in on the attack. According to one of the victims, Gerald Hetzel, the Palestinians threw rocks "twice the size of my head" at the tourists, they used objects to attack them and damage their vehicle, and one Palestinian attacker wielded a knife and used it to stab the other unnamed tourist and to slash their vehicles tires. Hetzel said in an interview with local news, "I’ve never encountered a situation like this. It was a very very dangerous situation, and we really thought they wanted to kill us, young Arab men came from taxis around us and started to knock on our windows, to scream at us in Arabic, they were bringing stones and traffic signs and throwing everything against the car. After one or two minutes they pulled out a knife and stabbed the wheels of the car, and also threatened my friend. I didn’t understand what they wanted. We tried to tell them in English that we are tourists, and we are not Jewish Israelis, that we are there to visit and see the town, but they seemed to not understand it. They continued coming after us and walking after our car. It felt like they were hunting the car.", he explained that a Palestinian Authority police officer brought them over to the side of the road but the police were unable to do anything and did not call for backup, instead the police directed the pair to get back in their vehicle and drive away.

The mob grew to become "really big" and "really angry", said Hetzel, who added that police officers tried to tell the mob in Arabic to go away. "I really felt the hate from their eyes, and from the way they were acting. And they were throwing rocks, maybe double the size of my head, I thought they were only targeting religious-looking Jews, not international tourists.”" A group of Palestinians could be seen surrounding the tourists rented car, which has Israeli number plates, a sticker of the Israeli flag and the Tel Aviv municipality's logo, which has a deal with the ride-sharing company, Shlomo Sixt. Palestinians were seen hurling stones at the car, attempting to open the doors and attacking the German tourists. The German nationals eventually managed to escape the attack on foot. According to Channel 12 news, they were aided in their escape from the Palestinian attackers by an Israeli citizen who happened to be in the area. An Arab Israeli man signaled the tourists to follow him and led the way out of Nablus through side streets. The group continued to give chase and followed them in taxis and on foot but the tourists escaped the but their rental car was too heavily damaged, with all 4 tires were punctured by the Palestinians. The Arab Israeli gave the tourists a ride to the nearest Israeli checkpoint where he dropped them off to receive treatment from IDF medics. “We just wanted to drink coffee,” the tourists were quoted as saying. A military source said Israeli Defense Forces (IDF) medics treated the German nationals once they were outside of Nablus and left the area controlled by the Palestinian Authority. The pair suffered minor "superficial injuries."

Aftermath

In the aftermath of the attack, one of the victims, Gerald Hetzel reflected on the attack in an interview with KAN News, and was asked if the attack had changed his opinion of Israel. “It doesn’t change my entire view on Israel. I think Israel is a very friendly country, it definitely changes my view on the Palestinians and the Palestinian Authority areas in Judea and Samaria, [on a past trip to Bethlehem where he met a group of three 16-year old boys] They told me if they meet a Jew on the street, they want to kill him, just like this. And I think it’s a big problem they have so much hate in their education."

International reactions
 – German Ambassador to Israel Steffen Seibert responded to the attack later that day on Twitter, "A mob attacking tourists because they don‘t like their license plate is disgusting and cowardly. I thank the Palestinian Israeli citizen who saved them from the bottom of my heart."

See also

 Palestinian political violence
 Tourism in the State of Palestine
 2000 Ramallah lynching

References

Terrorist incidents involving vehicular attacks
Nablus lynching
Tourism in the State of Palestine
Lynching
Terrorist incidents in the West Bank in 2023
Ramallah Lynching
March 2023 crimes in Asia
 
Terrorist incidents in the West Bank in the 2020s
Anti-German sentiment
Germany–Israel relations
Tourism in Israel